was a Japanese professional baseball player.

Born in Manchuria, he was brought up in Hakodate, Hokkaido, but later moved to Tokyo. He started his baseball career playing for the Waseda University team, before turning professional by joining the Chunichi Dragons.

Personal life
His son, Takeshi Mori, is an anime director, and his daughter, Iku Mori, is a jazz singer. 

He died on 6 February 2014 from hepatocellular carcinoma, aged 78.

References

External links

1935 births
2014 deaths
Deaths from cancer in Japan
Waseda University alumni
Japanese baseball players
Chunichi Dragons players
Taiyō Whales players
Tokyo Orions players
Baseball announcers
Japanese people from Manchukuo
People from Hakodate
Baseball people from Hokkaido